Dentifrices, including toothpowder and toothpaste, are agents used along with a toothbrush to clean and polish natural teeth. They are supplied in paste, powder, gel, or liquid form.  Many dentifrices have been produced over the years, some focusing on marketing strategies to sell products, such as offering whitening capabilities. The most essential dentifrice recommended by dentists is toothpaste which is used in conjunction with a toothbrush to help remove food debris and dental plaque. Dentifrice is also the French word for toothpaste.

Types

Toothpaste 

Toothpaste is a dentifrice used in conjunction with a toothbrush to help maintain oral hygiene. The essential components are an abrasive, binder, surfactant and humectant. Other ingredients are also used.  The main purpose of the paste is to help remove debris and plaque with some marketed to serve accessory functions such as breath freshening and teeth whitening.

Tooth powder 

Tooth powder was historically used among the Romans to clean and whiten teeth, to fix them when loose, to strengthen the gums, and to assuage toothache. They made tooth powder from a variety of substances, such as the bones, hoofs, and horns of certain animals; crabs; oyster and murex shells; and egg-shells. These ingredients were reduced to a fine powder, sometimes after having been previously burnt.  Some versions contained honey, ground myrrh, nitre, salt, and hartshorn, which would be added after the initial powdering process. Pliny the Elder reported the use of pounded pumice as a dentifrice. Arguably the best-known mention of tooth care among the Romans is found in a letter by Apuleius, who complains that using tooth powder is nothing to be ashamed of, especially compared to the "utterly repulsive things they do in Spain." Apuleius quotes Catullus in saying that he would be using his own urine "to brush his teeth and his red gums."

By 1924, diatomaceous earth was mined for tooth powder. In modern times, baking soda has been the most commonly used tooth powder.

The use of powdered substances such as charcoal, brick, and salt for cleaning teeth has been historically widespread in India, particularly in rural areas. Modern tooth powder has been positioned as a cost-effective substitute for toothpaste, as it can be applied with the index finger without requiring use of a toothbrush.

Mouthwash 

Mouthwashes come in a variety of compositions, many claiming to kill bacteria that make up plaque or to freshen breath. In their basic form, they are usually recommended for use after brushing but some manufacturers recommend pre-brush rinsing. Dental research has recommended that mouthwash should be used as an aid to brushing rather than a replacement, because the sticky resistant nature of plaque prevents it from being actively removed by chemicals alone, and physical detachment of the sticky proteins is required.

See also

 List of toothpaste brands

References 

Oral hygiene
Dentifrices